Thickness may refer to:
 Thickness (graph theory)
 Thickness (geology), the distance across a layer of rock 
 Thickness (meteorology), the difference in height between two atmospheric pressure levels
 Thickness planer a woodworking machine
 Optical thickness in optics
 Thickness, a concept in the game Go
 Thickness of a fluid, an informal name for viscosity

See also
 
 
 Thick (disambiguation)
 Gauge (disambiguation)
 Size
 Width